Colonel Dawn Valerie Vautin Jackson,  (22 February 1917 – 20 January 1995) was an Australian military officer. She served as director of the Women's Royal Australian Army Corps from 1957 to 1972, and is credited with a policy change allowing Australian servicewomen to serve overseas for the first time.

Jackson was born in Kent, England, and was educated at St Catherine's School, Sydney, Australia.

Jackson was appointed an Officer of the Order of the British Empire in 1960.

References

1917 births
1995 deaths
Australian colonels
Australian Army personnel of World War II
Australian Officers of the Order of the British Empire
People from Kent
Women in the Australian military
Women's Royal Australian Army Corps officers
20th-century Australian women
British emigrants to Australia